Vischer is a surname, and my refer to:

 Vischer family of Nuremberg, a family of sculptors active in Nuremberg between 1453 and 1549
Hermann Vischer, the Elder (died 1487)
Peter Vischer the Elder (1455–1529)
Hermann Vischer, the Younger (1486–1517)
Peter Vischer the Younger (1487–1528)
Hans Vischer (1486-1546)
 Blanca Vischer (1915–1969), Guatemalan film actress
 Friedrich Theodor Vischer (1807–1887), a German novelist and philosopher
 Phil Vischer (born 1966), director and co-creator of VeggieTales
 Wilhelm Vischer (1895–1988), a Swiss pastor and theologian
 Wilhelm Vischer (botanist) (1890–1960), a Swiss botanist

German-language surnames